A adductor muscle is any muscle that causes adduction. It may refer to:

Humans 

 Adductor muscles of the hip, the most common reference in humans, but may also refer to
 Adductor brevis muscle, a muscle in the thigh situated immediately behind the pectineus and adductor longus
 Adductor hallucis muscle, a muscle responsible for adducting the big toe
 Adductor longus muscle, a skeletal muscle located in the thigh
 Adductor magnus on the medial side of the thigh
 Adductor minimus muscle, a small and flat skeletal muscle in the thigh
 Adductor pollicis muscle, a muscle in the hand that functions to adduct the thumb

Other animals 
Adductor muscles (bivalve), a muscle in the interior of a bivalve mollusk which close the valves
 The large foot-to-shell muscle in gastropods such as the abalone and limpet